, is an extreme trans-Neptunian object of the extended scattered disc in the outermost region of the Solar System, approximately 180 kilometers in diameter. It was discovered by astronomers at the Mauna Kea Observatory on 26 April 2003.

Description 

 orbits the Sun at a distance of 38.1–294.2 AU once every 2141 years and 10 months (782,317 days). Its orbit has an eccentricity of 0.77 and an inclination of 15° with respect to the ecliptic.

Extended scattered disc 

It is one of a small group of extreme trans-Neptunian objects with perihelion distances of 30 AU or more, and semi-major axes of 150 AU or more. Such objects can not have reached their present-day orbits without the gravitational influence of some perturbing object, which lead to the speculation of planet nine.

Physical characterization 

 has a BR-type spectrum and an estimated diameter of 147 and 200 kilometers based on an assumed albedo of 0.09 and 0.04, respectively.

References

External links 
 Asteroid Lightcurve Database (LCDB), query form (info )
 Discovery Circumstances: Numbered Minor Planets (505001)-(510000) – Minor Planet Center
 
 

506479
506479
20030426